This is an alphabetical list of towns and villages in Northern Ireland. For a list sorted by population, see the list of settlements in Northern Ireland by population. The towns of Armagh, Lisburn and Newry are also classed as cities (see city status in the United Kingdom).

The Northern Ireland Statistics and Research Agency (NISRA) uses the following definitions:
 Town – population of 4,500 or more
 Small Town – population between 4,500 and 10,000
 Medium Town – population between 10,000 and 18,000
 Large Town – population between 18,000 and 75,000
 Intermediate settlement – population between 2,250 and 4,500
 Village – population between 1,000 and 2,250
 Small villages or hamlets – population of less than 1,000

Towns are listed in bold.



A
Acton, Aghacommon, Aghadowey, Aghadrumsee, Aghagallon, Aghalee, Ahoghill, Aldergrove, Altamuskin, Altishane, Altmore, Annaclone, Annaghmore, Annahilt, Annahugh, Annalong, Annsborough, Antrim, Ardboe, Ardgarvan, Ardglass, Ardmore, Ardstraw, Armagh, Armoy, Arney, Articlave, Artigarvan, Artikelly, Atticall, Aughafatten, Augher, Aughnacloy

B
Ballela, Ballerin, Ballinamallard, Ballintoy, Balloo, Ballybogy, Ballycarry, Ballycassidy, Ballycastle, Ballyclare, Ballyeaston, Ballygally, Ballygawley, Ballygowan, Ballyhalbert, Ballyhornan, Ballykelly, Ballykinler, Ballylesson, Ballylinney, Ballymacmaine, Ballymacnab, Ballymagorry, Ballymartin, Ballymaguigan, Ballymena, Ballymoney, Ballynahinch, Ballynure, Ballyrashane, Ballyrobert, Ballyronan, Ballyrory, Ballyscullion, Ballyskeagh, Ballystrudder, Ballyvoy, Ballywalter, Balnamore, Banagher, Banbridge, Bangor, Bannfoot, Belcoo, Belfast, Bellaghy, Bellanaleck, Bellarena, Belleek, Belleeks, Benburb, Bendooragh, Beragh, Bessbrook, Blackskull, Blackwatertown, Blaney, Bleary, Boho, Brackaville, Bready, Brockagh, Brookeborough, Broomhill, Broughshane, Bryansford, Buckna, Burnfoot, Burren, Bushmills

C
Caledon, Camlough, Campsie, Capecastle, Cappagh, Cargan, Carnalbanagh, Carncastle, Carnlough, Carnteel, Carrickaness, Carrickfergus, Carrickmore, Carrowclare, Carrowdore, Carrybridge, Carryduff, Castlecaulfield, Castledawson, Castlederg, Castlerock, Castlewellan, Charlemont, Clabby, Clady (Co. Londonderry), Clady (Co. Tyrone), Cladymore, Clanabogan, Claudy, Clogh, Clogher, Cloghy, Clonmore, Clonoe, Clough, Cloughmills, Coagh, Coalisland, Cogry-Kilbride, Coleraine, Collegeland, Comber, Conlig, Cookstown, Corbet, Corkey, Corrinshego, Craigarogan, Craigavon, Cranagh, Crawfordsburn, Creagh, Creggan, Crossgar, Crossmaglen, Crumlin, Cullaville, Cullybackey, Cullyhanna, Culmore, Culnady, Curran, Cushendall, Cushendun

D
Darkley, Derry, Derrycrin, Derrygonnelly, Derryhale, Derrykeighan, Derrylin, Derrymacash, Derrymore, Derrynaflaw, Derrynoose, Derrytrasna, Derrytresk, Derryvore, Dervock, Desertmartin, Doagh, Dollingstown, Donagh, Donaghadee, Donaghcloney, Donaghey, Donaghmore, Donegore, Dooish, Dorsey, Douglas Bridge, Downhill, Downpatrick, Draperstown, Drains Bay, Dromara, Dromintee, Dromore (Co. Down), Dromore (Co. Tyrone), Drumaness, Drumbeg, Drumbo, Drumlaghy, Drumlough (near Hillsborough), Drumlough (near Rathfriland), Drummullan, Drumnacanvy, Drumnakilly, Drumquin, Drumraighland, Drumsurn, Dunadry, Dundonald, Dundrod, Dundrum, Dungannon, Dungiven, Dunloy, Dunnamanagh, Dunmurry, Dunnamore, Dunnaval, Dunseverick

E
Edenaveys, Edenderry (Co. Down), Edenderry (Co. Tyrone), Ederney, Eglinton, Eglish, Enniskillen, Erganagh, Eskra

F
Feeny, Finaghy, Fintona, Finvoy, Fivemiletown, Florencecourt, Foreglen, Forkill

G
Galbally, Gamblestown, Garrison, Garvagh, Garvaghey, Garvetagh, Gawley's Gate, Gibson's Hill, Gilford, Gillygooly, Glack, Glebe, Glenarm, Glenavy, Glencull Glengormley, Glenmornan, Glenoe, Glenone, Glynn, Gortaclare, Gortin, Gortnahey, Goshedan, Gracehill, Grange Corner, Granville, Greencastle, Greenisland, Greyabbey, Greysteel, Groggan, Groomsport, Gulladuff

H
Halfpenny Gate, Hamiltonsbawn, Helen's Bay, Hillhall, Hillsborough, Hilltown, Holywell, Holywood

I
Inishrush, Irvinestown, Islandmagee

J
Jonesborough, Jerrettspass, Jordanstown

K
Katesbridge, Keady, Kells-Connor, Kellswater, Kesh, Keshbridge, Kilcoo, Kildress, Kilkeel, Killadeas, Killaloo, Killay, Killead, Killeen, Killen, Killeter, Killinchy, Killough, Killowen, Killylea, Killyleagh, Killyman, Killywool, Kilmore (Co. Armagh), Kilmore (Co. Down), Kilrea, Kilskeery, Kinallen, Kinawley, Kircubbin, Knockcloghrim, Knockmoyle, Knocknacarry

L
Lack, Lambeg, Landahaussy, Largy, Larne, Laurelvale, Lawrencetown, Leitrim, Letterbreen, Lettershendoney, Limavady, Lisbellaw, Lisburn, Lislea, Lisnadill, Lisnarick, Lisnaskea, Listooder, Loughbrickland, Loughgall, Loughgilly, Loughguile, Loughinisland, Loughmacrory, Loup, Lower Ballinderry, Lurgan, Lurganare, Lurganure, Lurganville,

M
Macken, Macosquin, Madden, Maghaberry, Maghera, Magheraconluce, Magherafelt, Magheralin, Magheramason, Magheramorne, Magheraveely, Maghery, Maguiresbridge, Markethill, Martinstown, Maydown, Mayobridge, Mazetown, Meigh, Middletown, Milford, Millbank, Mill Bay, Millisle, Milltown (Co. Antrim), Moira, Monea, Moneyglass, Moneymore, Moneyneany, Moneyreagh, Moneyslane, Monteith, Moortown, Moss-Side, Mountfield, Mountjoy, Mounthill, Mountnorris, Moy, Moygashel, Mullaghbawn, Mullaghboy, Mullaghbrack, Mullaghglass, Mallusk

N
Newbuildings, Newcastle, Newry, Newtown Crommelin, Newtownabbey, Newtownards, Newtownbutler, Newtowncloghoge, Newtownhamilton, Newtownstewart, Nixon's Corner, Newmills

O
Omagh, Orritor

P
Park, Parkgate, Plumbridge, Pomeroy, Portadown, Portaferry, Portavogie, Portballintrae, Portbraddon, Portglenone, Portrush, Portstewart, Poyntzpass

R
Raloo, Randalstown, Rasharkin, Rathfriland, Ravernet, Richhill, Ringsend, Rock, Rosslea, Rostrevor, Roughfort, Rousky

S
Saintfield, Sandholes, Scarva, Scotch Street, Seaforde, Seskinore, Shanmaghery, Shanvey, Sheeptown, Shrigley, Silverbridge, Sion Mills, Sixmilecross, Skea, Spa, Spamount, Springfield, Stewartstown, Stoneyford, Strabane, Straid, Straidarran, Strangford, Stranocum, Strathfoyle, Straw, Swatragh

T
Tamlaght (Co. Fermanagh), Tamlaght (Co. Londonderry), Tamnamore, Tandragee, Tartaraghan, Teemore, Templepatrick, Tempo, The Birches, Tobermore, Toome, Trillick, Trory, Tullyhogue, Tullyhommon, Tullylish, Tullynacross, Tullywiggan, Tynan

U
Upper Ballinderry, Upperlands

V
Victoria Bridge

W
Waringsford, Waringstown, Warrenpoint, Washing Bay, Waterfoot, Wattlebridge, Whitecross, Whitehead, Whiterock, Whitehouse (Antrim), Whitehouse (Tyrone)

See also

 List of settlements in Northern Ireland by population
 List of settlements on the island of Ireland by population
 List of towns and villages in the Republic of Ireland
 List of places in Northern Ireland
 List of places in Ireland
 List of cities in Ireland and List of cities in the United Kingdom

 
 
 
 
Northern Ireland
Towns and villages in Northern Ireland
Northern Ireland